Route 167 is a short,  state highway in Atlantic and Burlington counties in New Jersey. The route is one of the few discontinuous state highways in New Jersey, split by wetlands, the Garden State Parkway and the Mullica River. Although the alignment is registered by the New Jersey Department of Transportation as  highway, the amount of roadway is considerably shorter. The route begins at an intersection with U.S. Route 9 (US 9) in Port Republic, where it continues along Old New York Road to an end of roadway at the Parkway embankment. Across the Mullica River, Route 167 continues at a gate for wetlands, heading northward to an intersection with US 9 in Bass River Township.
 
The route originated as part of New Jersey Route 4 during construction of a new state highway in 1917. Route 4 was built northward to the current Route 167 northern terminus in 1926, which was designated as part of US 9 that year. The route remained intact until construction of the Garden State Parkway and a new bridge over the Mullica River in the early 1950s. When the bridge was finished, US 9 was realigned off the roadway and the prior alignment became Route 167 during the New Jersey state highway renumbering. The route was split twice since 1953, first by the removal of the old Mullica River bridge in 1962 as part of a sale to the National Park Service for a refuge in Virginia, then the northern portion was dismantled except for a  alignment for a wetland mitigation project. Today, the route remains split and the road is still maintained by the state. Most of the route is unsigned with the exception of mile markers at its southern terminus which acknowledge the route's existence.

Route description

Route 167's southern terminus is located at an intersection with US 9 (New York Road) in the city of Port Republic. The route then intersects with the original alignment of New York Road, now known today as Old New York Road. Route 167 crosses over a stream, intersecting a privately maintained roadway soon after. The route approaches the Garden State Parkway, but ends at a gate and embankment nearby.

The route intersects Bogan Lane and comes to an end at an intersection with US 9. The route's official speed limit, which is not signed, is 25 mph (40 km/h) at its southern segment and 50 mph (80 km/h) in its northern segment.

History
Route 167 originates as a part of New Jersey Route 4 from Absecon to Rahway, designated in the 1920s. The route remained intact for several years, receiving the co-designation of US 9 in 1926, when the nationwide system was assigned. In 1927, the New Jersey State Highway Department had a statewide state highway renumbering, extending Route 4 in both directions.  The two routes remained intact until Route 4 was truncated to Bergen County during the 1953 state highway renumbering.) The roadway itself remained until construction of the Garden State Parkway's tenth section from New Jersey Route 43 in Absecon to Dover Road in 1954. In August of that year, a bridge over the Mullica River for the Parkway, onto which US 9 was realigned, was completed, replacing the alignment over the old structure. During construction, Route 4 and US 9 were realigned onto a temporary alignment to the older structure, while the old one remained unnumbered.

Upon the realignment of US 9, the State Highway Department renumbered the former alignment as Route 167. The former portion became a gravel road upon completion in Port Republic. Route 167 now continued along the former alignment, using the iron truss bridge built in 1917 for Route 4 to the intersection with US 9 in Bass River Township. The old iron truss bridge lasted several years after the realignment, lasting past 1960. The truss bridge was dismantled in 1962, and sold to the state of Virginia and the National Park Service for the National Wildlife Refuge. The route remained intact for a couple decades, with a gap in the highway.

The route's northern half from the Mullica River, constructed in 1926 as part of Route 4, was dismantled in 1984 for Edwin B. Forsythe National Wildlife Refuge. As of 2007, Route 167 is unsigned, running from US 9 in Port Republic to the bank of the Garden State Parkway at the Mullica River Bridge on its south side and from US 9 to a gate on the north side.

Major intersections

See also

References

External links

BASS RIVER TOWNSHIP, N.J. HISTORY... etc. "Gridlock Comes to New Gretna" - Blog post about history of Mullica River bridge

167
Transportation in Atlantic County, New Jersey
167
U.S. Route 9
State highways in the United States shorter than one mile